In the U.S. state of Nebraska, U.S. Highway 34 is a highway which goes between the Colorado border west of Haigler to the Iowa border east of Plattsmouth. Between Culbertson and Hastings, U.S. 34 overlaps U.S. Highway 6. From Grand Island to Lincoln, U.S. 34 has been replaced by Interstate 80 as a high-speed corridor and mostly serves local traffic. On this portion of the highway, U.S. 34 is continuously north of Interstate 80.  Within Lincoln, U.S. 34 runs concurrent with all of Interstate 180, and much of it follows O Street.

Route description

U.S. Highway 34 begins west of Haigler. At Haigler, it meets Nebraska Highway 27, which connects with K-27 in Kansas. It continues east to Benkelman, where it intersects and overlaps with Nebraska Highway 61 and briefly turns north. After leaving Benkelman, the overlap ends, and U.S. 34 continues northeast through Max and Stratton before meeting Nebraska Highway 25 in Trenton. Before reaching Culbertson, it intersects U.S. Highway 6.

U.S. 34 and U.S. 6 then pass through Culbertson, where they intersect Nebraska Highway 17. They go east together through McCook, where they meet U.S. Highway 83 and briefly overlap. They continue east through Indianola and Bartley, and at Cambridge, intersect the southern segment of Nebraska Highway 47. After passing through Holbrook, they intersect U.S. Highway 283 in Arapahoe.

After Arapahoe, U.S. 34 and U.S. 6 continue east, intersecting U.S. Highway 136, Nebraska Highway 46 and Nebraska Highway 4 before turning northeast. After passing through Atlanta, they meet Nebraska Highway 23 and U.S. Highway 183 in Holdrege. They continue northeasterly through Funk before intersecting and overlapping Nebraska Highway 44 through Axtell. They then continue through Minden, where they intersect Nebraska Highway 10. They continue going northeast through Heartwell, where the road turns due east. At Hastings, U.S. 34 and U.S. 6 intersect U.S. Highway 281, and U.S. 34 then turns north with U.S. 281. U.S. 34 and U.S. 281 then follow a divided highway north to Grand Island, intersecting Interstate 80 south of Grand Island near its crossing of the Platte River. At the southern end of Grand Island, U.S. 34 ends its overlap with U.S. 281 and turns east, overlapping the western segment of Nebraska Highway 2.

U.S. 34 and Nebraska Highway 2 continue east through the southern portion of Grand Island, where they briefly enter Merrick County while crossing the Platte River. The two highways end their overlap shortly after this crossing. U.S. 34 then continues east through Aurora and intersecting Nebraska Highway 14 there. It then passes through Hampton and Bradshaw before meeting U.S. Highway 81 in York. After passing through Waco, U.S. 34 then intersects Nebraska Highway 69. It then continues through Utica and Tamora before meeting Nebraska Highway 15 in Seward. U.S. 34 continues east and becomes a divided highway when it intersects Nebraska Highway 79.

U.S. 34 passes north of the Lincoln Airport as the Purple Heart Highway before it curves south towards downtown Lincoln and intersects with Interstate 80 and U.S. Highway 77. At I-80, a new overlap begins with Interstate 180, which overlaps U.S. 34 for its entire length to downtown. U.S. 34 then becomes a pair of one-way streets, North 9th Street and North 10th Streets, where Interstate 180 ends. U.S. 34 turns east on "O" Street in downtown Lincoln just a few blocks later.

U.S. 34 then continues due east from Lincoln, intersecting Nebraska Highway 43 in Eagle. It then intersects Nebraska Highway 63 east of Eagle and then Nebraska Highway 1 near Elmwood. It then intersects Nebraska Highway 50 and Nebraska Highway 67 before passing through Union. It then turns north with U.S. 75, intersects Nebraska Highway 1 again near Murray, and then intersects Nebraska Highway 66 in Plattsmouth. It then passes through Plattsmouth and over the Platte River, then splits from U.S. 75 just south of Bellevue, turning east where it enters Iowa.

History

U.S. 34 was realigned onto a new divided highway northwest of Lincoln in late 1963, shortly after the opening of I-180, which was also incorporated into U.S. 34. The highway's former alignment was demolished to make way for an expansion of the Lincoln Air Force Base (now Lincoln Airport). In 1997, this  section of U.S. 34 was designated as the Purple Heart Highway.

Prior to 2014, U.S. 34 entered Iowa at the Plattsmouth Bridge east of Plattsmouth. A new bridge was built near La Platte and opened to traffic on October 22, 2014, bringing it more in line with the current U.S. 34 alignment near Glenwood, Iowa.

Major intersections

See also
U.S. Route 34
Interstate 180 (Nebraska)

References

34
 Nebraska
Transportation in Dundy County, Nebraska
Transportation in Hitchcock County, Nebraska
Transportation in Red Willow County, Nebraska
Transportation in Furnas County, Nebraska
Transportation in Harlan County, Nebraska
Transportation in Phelps County, Nebraska
Transportation in Kearney County, Nebraska
Transportation in Adams County, Nebraska
Transportation in Hall County, Nebraska
Transportation in Merrick County, Nebraska
Transportation in Hamilton County, Nebraska
Transportation in York County, Nebraska
Transportation in Seward County, Nebraska
Transportation in Lincoln, Nebraska
Transportation in Cass County, Nebraska
Transportation in Sarpy County, Nebraska
Transportation in Lancaster County, Nebraska